The Jeffersons is an American sitcom television series that was broadcast on CBS from January 18, 1975, to July 2, 1985, lasting 11 seasons and a total of 253 episodes. The Jeffersons is one of the longest-running sitcoms in history, the second-longest-running series with a primarily African American cast by episode count behind Tyler Perry's House of Payne and the first to prominently feature a married interracial couple.

Show
The show focuses on George and Louise Jefferson, a prosperous African-American couple who have been able to move from Queens to Manhattan owing to the success of George's dry-cleaning chain, Jefferson Cleaners. The show was launched as the second (and longest running) spin-off of All in the Family, on which the Jeffersons had been the neighbors of Archie and Edith Bunker. The show was the creation of Norman Lear. The Jeffersons eventually evolved into more of a traditional sitcom, but episodes occasionally focused on serious issues such as alcoholism, racism, suicide, gun control, being transgender, the KKK, and adult illiteracy. The epithets nigger and honky were used occasionally, especially during the earlier seasons.

The Jeffersons had one spin-off, titled Checking In. The series was centered on the Jeffersons' housekeeper, Florence, who takes a job as cleaning management at a hotel. Checking In lasted only four episodes, after which Florence returned to The Jeffersons with the story that the hotel had burned down in a fire. The Jeffersons also shared continuity with the sitcom E/R, which featured Lynne Moody who made a guest appearance in one episode of The Jeffersons. Sherman Hemsley guest-starred as George in two episodes of the series, which lasted for one season. The cancellation of The Jeffersons cleared the way for Marla Gibbs, who played Florence Johnston on the series, to move on to the NBC sitcom 227 in the fall of 1985, a year earlier than scheduled.

The Jeffersons ended in controversy after CBS abruptly canceled the series without allowing for a proper series finale. The cast was not informed until after the July 2, 1985, episode, "Red Robins"; actor Sherman Hemsley, who portrayed George Jefferson, said he learned that the show was canceled by reading it in the newspaper. Isabel Sanford (Louise Jefferson), who heard about the cancellation through her cousin who read it in the tabloids, has publicly stated that she found the cancellation with no proper finale to be disrespectful on the network's part.  Per an article in the May 8, 1985, Los Angeles Times, the series was cancelled by announcement at the CBS network "upfront" presentation the day before, nearly two months before the airing of the final episode. Actor Franklin Cover, who played Tom Willis, also heard about the cancellation while watching Entertainment Tonight.

The cast reunited in a stage play based on the sitcom. In season 5 episode 17 of The Fresh Prince of Bel-Air, titled "Will Is from Mars" (1995), the Jeffersons made a guest appearance as a couple in therapy class. In the 1996 series finale of The Fresh Prince of Bel-Air, the Jeffersons made a guest appearance as the buyers of the Banks family house. In an episode of Tyler Perry's House of Payne in 2011, Sherman Hemsley and Marla Gibbs reprised their roles of George Jefferson and Florence Johnston.

In 1985, Hemsley and Sanford made a special joint guest appearance in the Canale 5 comedy show Grand Hotel, starring the Italian actors Paolo Villaggio, the comic duo Franco & Ciccio, and Carmen Russo. They were guests in the fictional hotel and their voices were dubbed by Italian actors Enzo Garinei (George) and Isa di Marzio (Louise), who also dubbed their characters for the full series. , the members still alive from the main cast include Marla Gibbs, Berlinda Tolbert, and Damon Evans.

Series development
Louise Jefferson, played by Isabel Sanford, first appeared in the All in the Family episode "Lionel Moves Into the Neighborhood", which was broadcast on March 2, 1971. The episode, the eighth of the series, centers on Louise, her son Lionel, and her husband George moving next door to Archie and Edith Bunker in the working-class section of Queens. Lionel, played by Mike Evans, first appeared in "Meet the Bunkers", the premiere episode of All in the Family.

Norman Lear created the character of George Jefferson specifically for Hemsley. Lear originally intended for George to appear in the first season of the series, but Hemsley was starring in the Broadway musical Purlie at the time, and Lear decided to postpone introduction of the character until Hemsley was available. Lear created the character of Henry Jefferson, George's younger brother, who was portrayed by Mel Stewart which replaced George with Henry in the series's scripts until Purlie finished its run. Henry played as George when Louise felt embarrassed that George did not want to be in Archie Bunker's house due to prejudice. George was introduced in the episode "Henry's Farewell", and Hemsley and Stewart share their only scene together in its final minutes. The episode marked the final appearance of Henry throughout the series.

The idea of the Jeffersons "moving on up" came after three members of the Black Panthers who were fans of Lear's productions visited Lear's CBS office, raising issues with the creator over the portrayal of Black people on television, including his "Maude" spin-off series "Good Times." “Every time you see a Black man on the tube, he is dirt poor, wears shit clothes, can’t afford nothing," Lear recalled in his autobiography. Lear consulted with his associate Al Burton on the concept.

George, Louise, and Lionel continued to appear on All in the Family until 1975, when the spin-off The Jeffersons, also created by Lear, premiered. The characters of Lionel's multiracial fiancée, Jenny, and her family, all of whom first appeared in the 1974 All in the Family episode "Lionel's Engagement", were also written into the new series. However, the roles were all recast, with Berlinda Tolbert taking over the role of Jenny, veteran actor Franklin Cover playing her father, Tom Willis, whose first name was changed from Louis, as it was in their first All in the Family appearance, and Roxie Roker as her mother, Helen. Roxie Roker was asked during a casting interview if she'd be comfortable with her character having a white husband. In response she showed a picture of her husband, Sy Kravitz, who was white.

Synopsis

During the January 11, 1975 episode of All in the Family, titled "The Jeffersons Move Up", Edith Bunker gave a tearful good-bye to her neighbor Louise Jefferson as her husband George, their son Lionel, and she moved from a working-class section of Queens, New York, into the luxurious Colby East, a fictitious high-rise apartment complex on East 63rd Street in Manhattan. The Jeffersons premiered the following week, on January 18, 1975.

George's career as a dry-cleaner began in the first season of All in the Family in the third episode "Oh, My Aching Back" (though the character himself did not appear on-camera). After his car was rear-ended by a bus, he filed a civil action and won $5000, enough to open his first store in Queens. At the beginning of The Jeffersons, he was operating five stores throughout New York City, with another two opening during the following seasons.

Louise made friends with Tom and Helen Willis, an interracial couple with two adult children of their own (whom George derided as "zebras"): son Allan (played by Andrew Rubin in the first-season finale, and by Jay Hammer throughout season 5), a white-passing college drop-out; and daughter Jenny, an aspiring fashion designer. Jenny and Lionel became a couple, married on December 24, 1976, and later became the parents of a daughter, Jessica (played by Ebonie Smith). Lionel and Jenny experienced marital issues as evidenced in a two-part season 8 episode "The Separation", and divorced in the final season two-parter "Sayonara".

Marla Gibbs portrayed the role of Florence Johnston, the Jeffersons' back-talking, tough, wisecracking, and devoutly religious housekeeper. Florence often teased George, mostly about his short stature and receding hairline. One episode featured George requesting Florence to insult him, in order to get to a prospective business partner who was fond of her wisecracks.

Paul Benedict arrived as Harry Bentley, an amiable, kind, loyal yet somewhat obtuse British next-door neighbor, who worked as an interpreter at the United Nations. A frequent sight-gag of the show was George slamming the door in Bentley's face mid-conversation, usually during one of Bentley's stories which George invariably perceived as boring. Bentley also had a bad back, and frequently needed George to walk on it. He also became known for addressing the Jeffersons as "Mr. J" and "Mrs. J".

Zara Cully played George's mother, Olivia "Mother" Jefferson, who constantly disparaged her daughter-in-law. Cully, who had first appeared in the 1974 All in the Family episode "Lionel's Engagement", reprised her role. She appeared regularly in the first two seasons, but made sporadic appearances over the next two years, much thinner due to a severe case of pneumonia. Cully was written out in season 4 due to her death in 1978, from lung cancer. No episode was centered on Mother Jefferson's death, but it was occasionally mentioned that she had died in future episodes.

Ned Wertimer played their tip-hungry doorman, Ralph Hart, throughout the series. He was known for constantly stalling at the Jeffersons' door with his hand out waiting for a tip. Most of the cast usually didn't respond, but George almost always gave in. He also used it in a blackmail manner, usually requiring George to pay more in order to keep his mouth shut about something such as a stock tip. Ralph was also known for making up stories of him struggling to fulfill the Jeffersons request to get more tips.

Danny Wells played Charlie, the owner and a bartender of a nearby bar to the Jeffersons apartment building. The cast commonly visited the bar for a drink or to attend a party. Charlie was also revealed to be an alcoholic in the season 11 episode "A Secret in the Back Room", in which Charlie is in denial, but the Jeffersons eventually get him to admit to his problem and advise him to get some help. His alcohol problem isn't referenced anymore throughout the series, but it is assumable Charlie overcame it.

Cast changes

Mike Evans ("Lionel") left the show after the first season; his replacement was Damon Evans (no relation), who took over the role until halfway through the fourth season. Damon Evans's last episode was "Lionel Gets the Business".

Mike Evans and Tolbert returned in the 1979–1980 season, with Tolbert's character, Jenny, pregnant with a daughter named Jessica. However, Mike Evans appeared for only one more season, along with Tolbert. The Jeffersons sixth season peaked at No. 8 in the summer of 1980. The characters of Lionel and Jenny were written out by stating that they had marital problems, the result of which became a two-part episode storyline as the series' eighth-season premiere. The series' eighth season was the first African-American sitcom in years (since Sanford and Son) to peak in the top 5 (the series' eighth season debuted at No. 3).

Evans and Tolbert appeared in the two-part episode together; Evans made his final appearance in two episodes during the series' eleventh and final season. Tolbert became a regular guest star throughout the rest of the series. In the spring of 1981, Paul Benedict left the show for a season and a half, returning in the final two seasons of the series. However, the ratings sank below the top 30, and The Jeffersons aired its last episode, "Red Robins", on July 2, 1985.

Cast

Main

Recurring
 Ned Wertimer as Ralph Hart
 Danny Wells as Charlie Clark the bartender
 Ebonie Smith as Jessica Jefferson (season 11)

Notable guest appearances

 Frances Bay
 Johnny Brown
 Tom Brown
 Barbara Cason
 Charo
 Alvin Childress
 Gary Coleman
 Andrae Crouch
 Sammy Davis Jr.
 Frank De Vol
 Phyllis Diller (as herself)
 David Dukes
 Famous Amos
 Bernard Fox
 Joe Frazier
 Susie Garrett
 Louis Gossett Jr.
 Rosey Grier
 Robert Guillaume
 Moses Gunn
 Kene Holliday
 Reggie Jackson
 Victor Kilian
 Lincoln Kilpatrick
 Mabel King
 Gladys Knight
 Peter Lawford (voice)
 Larry Linville
 Carl Lumbly
 Helen Martin
 Edie McClurg
 Garrett Morris
 Greg Morris
 Josephine Premice
 Eddie Quillan
 Sheryl Lee Ralph
 Thalmus Rasulala
 Susan Ruttan
 Sister Sledge
 Michael Spinks
 Amzie Strickland
 Ernest Lee Thomas
 Liz Torres
 Vernee Watson
 Jaleel White
 Billy Dee Williams
 Hal Williams
 Irwin Keyes

Source

Episodes

The Jeffersons had many two-part episodes, either over two consecutive weeks, or aired as an hour-long episode.

Theme song
Ja'Net DuBois and Jeff Barry co-wrote The Jeffersons theme song, "Movin' on Up", which was sung by DuBois with a gospel choir.

Broadcast history and Nielsen ratings
The Jeffersons changed time slots at least 15 different times during its 11-year run, unusual for a popular long running series. The most common time slot was on Sunday night.

In its first season (1974–75), the show ranked at number four, surpassed by its parent series All in the Family (which landed at number one for the fifth year in a row). The show's ratings for the following two seasons placed it in the Top 30, but during the 1977–78 and 1978–79 seasons (the show's fourth and fifth seasons), it fell out of the top 30, ranking 52nd in Season 4 and 49th in Season 5.

It returned to the Top 10 in 1979–80, and at the end of the 1981–82 season, The Jeffersons finished third overall, only surpassed by fellow CBS series Dallas and 60 Minutes. As a result, the series remained among the Top 20 for the next two seasons.

Home media
Sony Pictures Home Entertainment released the first six seasons of The Jeffersons on DVD in Region 1 between 2002 and 2007.

On August 27, 2013, it was announced that Mill Creek Entertainment had acquired the rights to various television series from the Sony Pictures library including The Jeffersons. They subsequently re-released the first two seasons on DVD on May 20, 2014.

On August 8, 2014, it was announced that Shout! Factory had acquired the rights to the series; they subsequently released the complete series on DVD in a 33-disc collection on December 9, 2014.

On April 28, 2015, Shout! released season 7 on DVD in Region 1. Season 8 was released on August 11, 2015.

Awards and nominations

The Jeffersons received 14 Emmy Award nominations during its time on the air. Marla Gibbs was nominated for Best Supporting Actress in a Comedy Series each year from 1981 to 1985. Sherman Hemsley was nominated for Best Actor in 1984. Larry M. Harris won the Emmy for Outstanding Video Tape Editing for a Series in 1983.

Isabel Sanford was nominated for seven consecutive Best Actress Emmys, from 1979 until 1985. Her victory in 1981 made her the first African-American actress to win an Emmy for Best Actress in a Comedy Series, and the second to win any Emmy Award; Gail Fisher, who played Peggy on the TV show Mannix, preceded her in 1970. Sanford was also the recipient of five of the eight Golden Globe Awards nominations the program received.

2019 special

On May 22, 2019, ABC broadcast Live in Front of a Studio Audience: Norman Lear’s All in the Family and The Jeffersons, produced by Lear and Jimmy Kimmel and starring Woody Harrelson, Marisa Tomei, Jamie Foxx, Wanda Sykes, Ike Barinholtz, Kerry Washington, Ellie Kemper. Marla Gibbs reprised her role as Florence Johnston.

Notes

References

Further reading
 Moriarty, Jay (2020). "HONKY IN THE HOUSE – Writing & Producing The Jeffersons," Antler Publishing, LA, CA .
 Newcomb, Horace (Ed.). (1997). Encyclopedia of Television. Fitzroy Dearborn Publishers: Chicago, IL; .
 Mitchell, Gordon Whitey. (2008). Hackensack to Hollywood-My Two Show Business Careers. BearManor Media: Albany, NY; .

External links

 
 

1970s American black sitcoms
1975 American television series debuts
1980s American black sitcoms
1985 American television series endings
American television spin-offs
CBS original programming
English-language television shows
Fiction about interracial romance
Fictional married couples
Television series about families
Television series by Sony Pictures Television
Television series created by Norman Lear
Television shows set in Manhattan